The 1957–58 season was Mansfield Town's 20th season in the Football League and 15th season in the Third Division North, they finished in 6th position with 52 points. At the end of the season the Third Division North and Third Division South were merged to form the Third Division and Fourth Division.

Final league table

Results

Football League Third Division North

FA Cup

Squad statistics
 Squad list sourced from

References
General
 Mansfield Town 1957–58 at soccerbase.com (use drop down list to select relevant season)

Specific

Mansfield Town F.C. seasons
Mansfield Town